My Love', is a 1940 Soviet comedy film directed by Vladimir Korsh.

Plot 
The film tells about a nice girl who adopts a child, which as a result leads to various amusing situations.

Starring 
 Lidiya Smirnova as Shura
 Ivan Pereverzev as Lyosha
 Vladimir Chobur as Grisha 
 F. Chernousko		
 M. Klyuchareva
 N. Krikunova	
 Aleksei Matov
 Vladimir Shishkin
 Maria Shlenskaya
 Nikolai Sokolov
 Nikolay Trofimov

References

External links 
 
1940 comedy films
1940 films
Films scored by Isaak Dunayevsky
Remakes of Russian films
1940s Russian-language films
Soviet black-and-white films
Soviet comedy films